Frank Carter Duckworth MBE (born 26 December 1939, in Lytham St Annes, Lancashire) is a retired English statistician, and is one of the two statisticians who developed the Duckworth–Lewis method of resetting targets in interrupted one-day cricket matches. He attended King Edward VII School, Lytham, now part of King Edward VII and Queen Mary School, then went on to study physics (BSc Hons 1961) and earned a PhD (1965) in metallurgy, both at the University of Liverpool. Prior to his retirement, he worked as a mathematical scientist for the English nuclear power industry. He was a consultant statistician to the International Cricket Council, and the editor of the Royal Statistical Society's monthly news magazine, RSS News, until he retired from both these roles in 2014. He also served on the editorial board of Significance before stepping down in 2010. In 2004 he delivered the Royal Statistical Society Schools Lecture, entitled Lies and Statistics.

In 1962, Duckworth was a tenant of John Lennon's aunt.

Duckworth is also known for developing a system of quantifying personal risk perception, now known as the "Duckworth scale".

Duckworth was appointed Member of the Order of the British Empire (MBE) in the 2010 Birthday Honours.

References

Limited overs cricket
Living people
Alumni of the University of Liverpool
English statisticians
Members of the Order of the British Empire
1939 births